The Samsung Galaxy Note 10.1 is a 10.1-inch tablet computer designed, developed and marketed by Samsung Electronics. The tablet runs Android 4.0.3 (Android 4.1.2 in Europe) and serves as a platform for multimedia consumption including movies, music, and web browsing. It is the second entry in the Samsung Galaxy Note range, which emphasises the use of a stylus, officially named S-Pen (S standing for Samsung), as an input device for tasks such as sketching and note-taking.

Details
The Note 10.1 was originally unveiled on 27 February 2012 at the Mobile World Congress in Barcelona, Spain, with a 1.4 GHz dual-core processor. The tablet was released in Germany, Saudi Arabia and the UAE on 6 August 2012. This final version of the tablet incorporates a 1.4 GHz quad-core Exynos processor. The tablet comes with 16, 32 and 64 GB of internal storage, and 2 GB of DDR3 RAM. The Note 10.1 was launched in the United States, the United Kingdom, and South Korea on 16 August.

In 2014, Samsung began a rollout of Android 4.4.2 KitKat upgrade in Europe, both as an over-the-air (OTA) update and through Samsung Kies.  Samsung customized the interface with its updated TouchWiz UX software.

Reception
The Note 10.1 was well received by numerous technology outlets. Dave Oliver of Wired UK technology magazine gave a rating of 9 out of 10. The Note 10.1 was praised for its versatility, fast processor, writing interface, expandable memory and quality camera and described as a worthy challenger to the iPad. TechCrunch stated that the tablet was "awesome, great, and brilliant," with a bunch of S-pen optimized apps as a great feature.

See also
 Samsung Galaxy Note series
 Samsung Electronics
 Samsung Galaxy Note 8.0

References

External links

 Official website
 Galaxy Note 10.1 GT-N8000 User Manual
 Galaxy Note 10.1 Wifi Starter Guide

Android (operating system) devices
Tablet computers introduced in 2012
Galaxy Note 10.1

Tablet computers